The Copeland & Tracht Service Station, in recent years Grandpa Sal's Tires, is located at 1702 W. Van Buren in Phoenix, Arizona and was built in 1935. It was originally the J.J. Fitzgibbon Service Station.

It was listed on the National Register of Historic Places in 1985.

References

Gas stations on the National Register of Historic Places in Arizona
National Register of Historic Places in Maricopa County, Arizona
Buildings and structures completed in 1935